Veljko Milanković (5 January 1955 – 14 February 1993) was a Bosnian Serb war commander during the Yugoslav Wars with the rank of second lieutenant.

Milanković was badly wounded on 4 February 1993 in Donji Kašić, Croatia and later died of his wounds at the Military Medical Academy in Belgrade on 14 February 1993.

In 2007, it was announced that Milanković would have a street named after him in Novi Sad.  Non-governmental groups protested the decision.

See more 
 Wolves of Vučjak

References

1955 births
1993 deaths
People from Prnjavor, Bosnia and Herzegovina
Serbs of Bosnia and Herzegovina
Army of Republika Srpska soldiers
Military personnel of the Bosnian War
Military personnel of the Croatian War of Independence